The 25th Stinkers Bad Movie Awards were released by the Hastings Bad Cinema Society in 2003 to honour the worst films the film industry had to offer in 2002. Pinocchio received the most nominations with nine. All nominees and winners, with respective percentages of votes for each category, are listed below. Dishonourable mentions are also featured for Worst Picture (56 total).

Winners and nominees

Worst Film

Dishonourable Mentions 

 Abandon (Paramount)
 All the Queen's Men (Strand)
 Analyze That (Warner Bros.)
 Austin Powers in Goldmember (New Line)
 Bad Company (Touchstone)
 Ballistic: Ecks vs. Sever (Warner Bros.)
 Big Fat Liar (Universal)
 Big Trouble (Touchstone)
 Blade II (New Line)
 Collateral Damage (Warner Bros.)
 The Country Bears (Disney)
 Crossroads (Paramount)
 D-Tox (DEJ)
 Deuces Wild (MGM)
 Divine Secrets of the Ya-Ya Sisterhood (Warner Bros.)
 Dragonfly (Universal)
 Eight Crazy Nights (Sony)
 Enough (Sony)
 Extreme Ops (Paramount)
 FeardotCom (Warner Bros.)
 Femme Fatale (Warner Bros.)
 Formula 51 (Sony)
 Ghost Ship (Warner Bros.)
 Half Past Dead (Sony)
 Halloween: Resurrection (Dimension)
 Hansel & Gretel (Warner Bros.)
 High Crimes (FOX)
 Impostor (Dimension)
 Jason X (New Line)
 Juwanna Mann (Warner Bros.)
 Life or Something Like It (FOX)
 Men in Black II (Sony)
 Mr. Deeds (Sony)
 The New Guy (Sony)
 Panic Room (Sony)
 Queen of the Damned (Warner Bros.)
 Return to Never Land (Disney)
 Rollerball (MGM)
 Scooby-Doo (Warner Bros.)
 The Scorpion King (Universal)
 Serving Sara (Paramount)
 Showtime (Warner Bros.)
 Signs (Touchstone)
 Slackers (Sony)
 Snow Dogs (Disney)
 Solaris (FOX)
 Sorority Boys (Touchstone)
 Star Wars: Episode II – Attack of the Clones (FOX)
 Stealing Harvard (Sony)
 Super Troopers (FOX)
 The Sweetest Thing (Sony)
 The Time Machine (DreamWorks)
 The Truth About Charlie (Universal)
 Van Wilder (Artisan)
 Vulgar (Lionsgate)

Worst Director

Worst Actor

Worst Actress

Worst Supporting Actor

Worst Supporting Actress

Worst Screenplay for a Film Grossing More Than $100M Worldwide Using Hollywood Math

Most Painfully Unfunny Comedy

Worst Song or Song Performance in a Film or Its End Credits

Most Intrusive Musical Score

Worst On-Screen Couple

Worst Fake Accent (Male)

Worst Fake Accent (Female)

Most Annoying Non-Human Character 

 Note: Michael Jackson was not eligible in this category.

Worst Sequel

Worst Remake

Worst On-Screen Group

Most Distracting Celebrity Cameo Appearance

Worst Resurrection of a TV Show

Films with multiple wins and nominations

The following films received multiple nominations:

The following films received multiple wins:

References 

Stinkers Bad Movie Awards
Stinkers Bad Movie Awards